Chad James Chastain (born October 31, 1998) is an American professional stock car racing driver. He competes part-time in the NASCAR Xfinity Series, driving the No. 91 Chevrolet Camaro for DGM Racing and part-time in the NASCAR Craftsman Truck Series, driving the No. 41 Chevrolet Silverado for Niece Motorsports. He is the younger brother of NASCAR Cup Series driver Ross Chastain.

Racing career

Early career
Chastain has competed in races across the southeastern United States, winning over 40 features ranging from late models to the Florida Association of Stock Car Automobile Racing (FASCAR) Pro Truck Series, and was also the 2016 Pro Late Model champion at 4-17 Southern Speedway.

NASCAR

Craftsman Truck Series

2021
Chastain was announced as driver of the No. 45 Chevrolet for Niece Motorsports for the NASCAR Camping World Truck Series race at Watkins Glen International in 2021, replacing his brother Ross, who was ruled ineligible to run the race.

2022
In 2022, Chastain raced in No. 41 for Niece Motorsports at Indianapolis Raceway Park. He would also race in the No. 44 at Richmond Raceway.

Xfinity Series

2023
On March 13, 2023 it was announced Chad would make his debut in the 2023 RAPTOR King of Tough 250 at Atlanta Motor Speedway in the No. 91 for DGM Racing, a ride his brother Ross also shares.

Motorsports career results

NASCAR
(key) (Bold – Pole position awarded by qualifying time. Italics – Pole position earned by points standings or practice time. * – Most laps led.)

Xfinity Series

Craftsman Truck Series

References

External links
 

1998 births
Living people
People from Lee County, Florida
Racing drivers from Florida
NASCAR drivers